Viriclanis is a genus of moths in the family Sphingidae, containing only one species, Viriclanis kingstoni, which is known from Tanzania. Both the genus and the species were first described by Leif Aarvik in 1999.

References

Smerinthini
Monotypic moth genera